Linus Loves is the alias of Scottish dance music remixer/producer Duncan Reid and, until 2005, a duo consisting of himself and Kevin McKay. Reid and McKay co-founded Breastfed Recordings together in 2002 with Myles MacInnes, known as Mylo. McKay left the outfit in 2005, and Reid has continued using the moniker until the present day.

The outfit is best known for their 2003 hit single "Stand Back", with vocals by Sam Obernik. It is a cover version of the 1983 Stevie Nicks' song. The track peaked at number 31 on the UK Singles Chart in November 2003.

Reid has since become an in-demand remixer working on songs for various artists including Britney Spears, Kelis, Mika, Jamiroquai and Scissor Sisters.

Discography

Albums
Stage Invader (2006)

Extended plays
The Victoria Principle EP (2005)

Singles

Selected remixes
 Scissor Sisters - "I Don't Feel Like Dancin'" (2006)
 Jamelia - "Something About You" (2006)
 Justin Timberlake - "SexyBack" (2006)
 Groove Armada featuring Mutya Buena - "Song 4 Mutya (Out of Control)" (2007)
 The Killers - "Read My Mind" (2007)
 Kelis - "Lil Star" (2007)
 Mika - "Grace Kelly" (2007)
 Yoko Ono - "No, No, No" (2008)
 Alphabeat - "Fascination" (2008)
 Ladyhawke - "Dusk Till Dawn" (2008)
 Britney Spears - "Circus" (2009)
 Pixie Lott - "Mama Do (Uh Oh, Uh Oh)" (2009)
 Jamiroquai - "Blue Skies" (2010)
 Britney Spears - "Hold It Against Me" (2011)
 Theophilus London - "Wine and Chocolates" (2012)

References

External links

Discogs.com

British house music duos
Musical groups from Glasgow
Scottish house musicians
Scottish record producers
Remixers